Nessuno mi può giudicare may refer to:
 "Nessuno mi può giudicare" (song), a 1966 song by Caterina Caselli
 Nessuno mi può giudicare (1966 film), a musicarello film starring Laura Efrikian 
 Nessuno mi può giudicare (2011 film) or Escort in Love, a comedy film starring Paola Cortellesi and Raoul Bova